Rewind TV is an American digital television network owned by Nexstar Media Group, and is a spinoff/sister network of Antenna TV. The network's programming consists of classic television series, primarily sitcoms, from the 1980s to the early 2000s. Rewind TV's programming and advertising operations are headquartered in the WGN-TV studios in Chicago.

History

Origins and launch 
In July 2016, Antenna TV owner Tribune Broadcasting was considering adding a sister network which would take shows that draw older audiences, in an arrangement that proposed refocusing Antenna TV around shows targeting younger audiences. By April 26, 2021, this idea had evolved and Nexstar Media - which had bought out Tribune - announced that it would launch a new digital broadcast network - Rewind TV - focusing on sitcoms from the 1980s, 1990s and 2000s, serving as a complementary sister network to Antenna TV (which now focuses on shows from the 1950s, 1960s, and 1970s).

Rewind TV began operations at 5 a.m. on September 1, 2021, making the network available to 50 million households in the United States.

The network is available in many media markets via the digital subchannels of over-the-air television stations, and on select cable television providers, such as Xfinity through a local affiliate of the network and IPTV.

Rewind TV broadcasts 24 hours a day in either 480i standard definition or 720p high definition depending on market.

Programming
Rewind's lineup consists of sitcoms, including 227, Becker, Caroline in the City, Dear John, Designing Women, Diff'rent Strokes, The Drew Carey Show, The Facts of Life, Family Ties, It’s a Living, Growing Pains, Head of the Class, The Hogan Family, The John Larroquette Show, Just Shoot Me!, Mad About You, Mork & Mindy, Murphy Brown, My Two Dads, NewsRadio, Sabrina the Teenage Witch, Suddenly Susan, Who's the Boss?, and Wings.

Affiliates

References

External links

 

Television channels and stations established in 2021
Television networks in the United States
Classic television networks
Nostalgia television in the United States
Nexstar Media Group
2021 establishments in Illinois